Polypoetes copiosa is a moth of the family Notodontidae. It has a restricted distribution along the foothills of the Andes in western Ecuador.

The length of the forewings is 11–12 mm for males and 11.5–13.5 mm for females. The ground color of the forewings is dark gray-brown to black, but lighter and more sparsely scaled in the basal third. The hindwings are intense white to creamy white, with a few gray scales near the base.

The larvae feed on Celtis iguanaea. First instar larvae feed communally in a single cluster on the underside of the leaf. Later instars feed in loose groups, never eating the leaf midvein. Final instar caterpillars feed alone along the leaf's edge.

Etymology
The name is derived from the Latin word copiosus (meaning abundant) and refers to the fact that, while collecting in western Ecuador, numerous adults were observed at two locations flying in mid to late afternoon in close proximity to the branches of their host plant, Celtis iguanaea. A search of C. iguanaea foliage at these sites revealed huge numbers of eggs and larvae. It is not known whether Polypoetes copiosa is abundant every year at all times of the year, or whether these observations were instead the result of a sporadic, almost outbreak-type situation.

References

Moths described in 2008
Notodontidae of South America